Praça Luís de Camões (also known as Praça António Lereno, formerly Pracinha da Escola Grande) is the second main square of the capital city of Praia, Cape Verde. It is located between Rua Serpa Pinto and Avenida Andrade Corvo in the eastern part of the Plateau, the historical city centre of Praia. The square is named after the 16th century Portuguese writer Luís de Camões. 

Notable buildings and structures on the square:
monument to the physician António Lereno (1850-1916)
the former Escola Grande (primary school), built in 1877
the former public library, currently housing the rectorate of the University of Cape Verde

References

Plateau of Praia
Squares in Cape Verde